Sunji is a town of around 52,700 people in the southwest of Shanxi province, People's Republic of China, Hancheng under the administration of Linyi County,  to the east-southeast. It administers 45 villages.

References

Township-level divisions of Shanxi